Wang Xijie (born 14 January 1994) is a Chinese footballer currently playing as a defender for Kunshan.

Club career
Wang Xijie would start his career playing for the Jiangsu Youth while they participated within the 2011 China League Two season. He would also play for third tier club Jiangsu HHU before joining top tier club Jiangsu Suning where he would go on to make his debut in a Chinese FA Cup game against Guizhou Zhicheng on 13 May 2015, in a 5-1 victory. He would struggle to gain any playing time and on 1 May 2019 he was loaned out to third tier club Suzhou Dongwu where he was part of the squad that went on to gain promotion at the end of the 2019 China League Two campaign.       

On 27 August 2020 he would transfer to second tier club Kunshan on a free transfer. This would be followed by his debut in a league game on 23 September 2020 against Changchun Yatai in a 1-0 victory. After the game he would go on to establish himself as regular within the team and was part of the squad that won the division and promotion to the top tier at the end of the 2022 China League One campaign.

Career statistics
.

Honours

Club 
Kunshan
 China League One: 2022

References

External links
Wang Xijie at Worldfootball.net

1994 births
Living people
Chinese footballers
Association football defenders
China League Two players
China League One players
Jiangsu F.C. players
Suzhou Dongwu F.C. players
Kunshan F.C. players